Omnicide mostly refers to human extinction as a result of human action.

It can also refer to:
 Omnicide (album), an album by Scottish punk band Oi Polloi
 Omnicide – Creation Unleashed, an album by German melodic death metal band Neaera